Eraldo Anicio Gomes or simply Eraldo (born April 1, 1982 in Coronel Fabriciano), is a Brazilian striker.

Contract
Tupi (loan) 21 January 2008 to 5 May 2008
Cruzeiro 1 December 2005 to 30 November 2008

External links
CBF 

1982 births
Living people
Brazilian footballers
Brazilian expatriate footballers
Associação Atlética Internacional (Bebedouro) players
Villa Nova Atlético Clube players
Ipatinga Futebol Clube players
Cruzeiro Esporte Clube players
Associação Desportiva Cabofriense players
Sociedade Esportiva e Recreativa Caxias do Sul players
Tupi Football Club players
Esporte Clube São Bento players
Paulista Futebol Clube players
Marília Atlético Clube players
Esporte Clube Bahia players
Uberlândia Esporte Clube players
Grêmio Barueri Futebol players
Expatriate footballers in South Korea
Jeju United FC players
K League 1 players
Association football forwards